The 1993 All-Ireland Under-21 Hurling Championship was the 30th staging of the All-Ireland Under-21 Hurling Championship since its establishment by the Gaelic Athletic Association in 1964. The championship began on 16 April 1993 and ended on 3 October 1993.

Waterford entered the championship as the defending champions, however, they were beaten by Limerick in the first round of the Munster Championship.

On 3 October 1993, Galway won the championship following a 2-09 to 3-03 defeat of Kilkenny in a replay of the All-Ireland final. This was their sixth All-Ireland title overall and their first title since 1991.

Kilkenny's Damian Lawlor was the championship's top scorer with 3-29.

Results

Leinster Under-21 Hurling Championship

Quarter-finals

Semi-finals

Final

Munster Under-21 Hurling Championship

First round

Semi-finals

Final

Ulster Under-21 Hurling Championship

Semi-finals

Final

All-Ireland Under-21 Hurling Championship

Semi-finals

Finals

Championship statistics

Top scorers

Overall

References

Under
All-Ireland Under-21 Hurling Championship